Kayte Lauren Christensen (born November 16, 1980) is an American color commentator for the Sacramento Kings and former professional basketball player in the Women's National Basketball Association.

Early life and education
Kayte Lauren Christensen was born in Lakeview, Oregon to Randy and Cathy Christensen. She attended Modoc High School in Alturas, California and graduated in 1998. She was named the Shasta Cascade League MVP in her sophomore, junior and senior seasons. Her senior season saw her named the California Division V Player of the Year in 1998 en route to winning the California Interscholastic Federation Division V championship.

Christensen attended college at the University of California, Santa Barbara where she competed on the women's basketball team with future WNBA players Erin Buescher, Lindsay Taylor, and Kristen Mann.  She was named to the Big West Conference All-Freshman team in 1999 and was the 2002 Big West Player of the Year.

UC Santa Barbara statistics

Source

Professional basketball career
Christensen was selected by the Phoenix Mercury in the third round (40th overall) of the 2002 WNBA Draft. She spent four seasons with the Mercury before she signed with the Houston Comets on March 24, 2006. She was waived on May 19, 2006 when she failed to make Houston's regular-season roster. She was signed to a short-term injury hardship contract by Houston on May 23, 2006 before rejoining the Mercury on June 15, 2006.

After the 2006 season ended, Christensen became a free agent until she signed a contract with the Chicago Sky on March 8, 2007. She was released from the Chicago Sky on May 20, 2008 after missing games due to a recurring back injury.

Christensen has played professional basketball overseas in South Korea, Turkey, and Greece during the WNBA offseasons.

Christensen has twice been the recipient of the WNBA Offseason Community Assist Award, first in 2003 and second in 2004.

Sports commentating career
Christensen served as the Arizona State Sun Devils women's basketball radio color analyst, beginning in 2003, for the Sun Devil Sports Network on NBC 1190 AM.

Christensen served as a courtside reporter for the NBA's Sacramento Kings during Comcast SportsNet broadcasts at Sleep Train Arena. In May 2010, she was replaced by Jim Gray. She returned to her courtside role in the Kings' 2013–14 season. Prior to the start of the 2021-22 NBA season the Kings announced that Christensen would replace Doug Christie as the team's television broadcast color analyst.

She also has worked as a women's basketball color analyst for ESPN and ESPNU, a social media correspondent for the Phoenix Suns, and a social media engagement producer for The Arizona Republic.

Public diplomacy 
In June 2011, Christensen traveled to Venezuela as a SportsUnited Sports Envoy for the U.S. Department of State. In this function, she worked with Darvin Ham to conduct basketball clinics for 300 youth from underserved areas and met with Venezuelan sports officials. In so doing, Christensen helped contribute to SportsUnited's mission to promote greater understanding and inclusion through sport.

References

External links 

 
 
 UC Santa Barbara player profile

1980 births
Living people
American women's basketball players
Basketball players from Oregon
Chicago Sky players
Houston Comets players
People from Lakeview, Oregon
People from Alturas, California
Phoenix Mercury draft picks
Phoenix Mercury players
Power forwards (basketball)
UC Santa Barbara Gauchos women's basketball players